La Feria is a city in Cameron County, Texas, United States. Its population was 7,302 at the time of the 2010 census. It is part of the Brownsville–Harlingen–Raymondville, the Matamoros–Brownsville, and the McAllen–Edinburg–Mission metropolitan areas.

Geography

La Feria is located in western Cameron County at  (26.158253, –97.824973).

In 2004, the city annexed the Arroyo Alto CDP, increasing the population of the city by roughly 300 people.

Demographics

2020 census

As of the 2020 United States census, there were 6,817 people, 2,470 households, and 1,548 families residing in the city.

2000 census
As of the census of 2000,  6,115 people, 2,021 households, and 1,620 families were residing in the city. The population density was 3,075.1 people/sq mi (1,186.4/km2). The 2,895 housing units averaged 1,455.8/sq mi (561.7/km2). The  racial makeup of the city was 74.91% White, 0.26% African American, 0.43% Native American, 0.33% Asian, 20.76% from other races, and 3.32% from two or more races. Hispanics or Latinos of any race were 77.45% of the population.

Of the 2,021 households, 35.3% had children under 18 living with them, 58.4% were married couples living together, 18.6% had a female householder with no husband present, and 19.8% were not families. About 17.4% of all households were made up of individuals, and 11.4% had someone living alone who was 65 or older. The average household size was 3.03, and the average family size was 3.44.

In the city, the age istribution was  30.6% under 18, 9.6% from 18 to 24, 22.4% from 25 to 44, 18.6% from 45 to 64, and 18.9% who were 65  or older. The median age was 34 years. For every 100 females, there were 86.5 males. For every 100 females age 18 and over, there were 81.5 males.

The median income for a household in the city was $24,660, and for a family was $28,832. Males had a median income of $22,933 versus $15,497 for females. The per capita income for the city was $12,064. About 21.9% of families and 29.2% of the population were below the poverty line, including 44.1% of those under age 18 and 19.5% of those age 65 or over.

Government and infrastructure
The United States Postal Service operates the La Feria Post Office.

Education
La Feria is served by the La Feria Independent School District. In addition, residents may apply to magnet schools in the South Texas Independent School District.

Climate
The climate in this area is characterized by hot, humid summers and generally mild to cool winters. According to the Köppen climate classification, La Feria has a humid subtropical climate, Cfa on climate maps.

Notable people

 Raquel González, WWE wrestler and NXT Women's Champion
 Edward Nordman, fruit farmer and member of the Wisconsin State Assembly
 Emmy Ruiz, White House director of political strategy and outreach
 Billy Storms, Professional golfer competing in the PGA Senior Open three times.

References

External links

 City of La Feria Official Website

Cities in Cameron County, Texas
Cities in Texas